The Garrett ATF3 (US military designation F104) is a  3-spool turbofan engine developed at the California division of Garrett AiResearch. Due to mergers it is currently supported by Honeywell Aerospace. The engine is unusual as the core flow path is twice reversed 180 deg. Aft of the fan, the axial compressor has five stages, after which the gas path progresses to the aft end of the engine. There, it is reversed 180 deg and flows through a centrifugal compressor stage, the combustors and then the turbine stages. Beyond this, the flow is then reversed 180 deg again to exit in the fan bypass duct. All engine accessories are mounted on the aft end of the engine under an engine tail-cone.

Design and development

The ATF3 was first flown in the Teledyne Ryan YQM-98 Compass Cope R high altitude UAV, as the YF104-GA-100. The engine proved to have a very low infrared signature, as the hot turbine was not externally visible and the core exhaust mixed with the bypass air before exiting the engine. The pilots of U-2 high altitude chase planes reported being unable pick up the YQM-98A with either radar or IR sensors. It was later used in the Northrop Tacit Blue stealth demonstrator because of these characteristics.

The most significant application of the engine was on the Dassault HU-25 Guardian, developed for the US Coast Guard. It was also used on the Dassault Falcon 20G and Dassault Falcon 200.

The ATF3 was "selected by North American Rockwell for its new Series 60 Sabreliner business jet. . . . [H]owever, the ATF3 developed engineering and production problems. Delivery schedules were not met. North American Rockwell brought a $60 million suit against Garrett. . . . The suit was settled out of court for less than $5 million cash. The engine was ultimately selected for a version of the Dassault Falcon ordered by the U.S. Coast Guard for offshore surveillance."

Applications
 Dassault Falcon 20G
 Dassault Falcon 200
 Dassault HU-25 Guardian
 Northrop Tacit Blue
 Ryan YQM-98 R-Tern (Compass Cope R)

Specifications (ATF3/F104-GA-100)

See also

Citations

References

External links
 Honeywell Aerospace ATF3 page

Medium-bypass turbofan engines
Honeywell
1960s turbofan engines
Three-spool turbofan engines
Centrifugal-flow turbojet engines